Eletipadu is located in the West Godavari district, Andhra Pradesh, India, just west of the river Godavari. It is one of the oldest village beside Pekeru Town. Historically, Eletipadu's main industry is agriculture.

Demographics 
 Census of India, Eletipadu had a population of 1852. The total population constitute, 939 males and 913 females with a sex ratio of 972 females per 1000 males. 163 children are in the age group of 0–6 years, with sex ratio of 791. The average literacy rate stands at 81.71%.

References

Villages in West Godavari district